John Green (born 17 March 1967) is an English schoolmaster and former professional rugby union player. He is currently Headmaster of Seaford College.

He was educated at Campion School, Hornchurch, Cardiff University where he studied Sports Science and completed a Master's degree in Business and Sports Science, and the Open University (advanced diploma in Economics). He played rugby for England U16s, U19s and U23s and played professionally for Saracens from 1992 to 1997. Prior to becoming headmaster of Seaford College in 2013 he was Deputy Head of Ardingly College Prep School and Director of Sport, and Deputy Head of Hurstpierpoint College.

References 

1967 births
Living people
Alumni of Cardiff University
Saracens F.C. players
English rugby union players